Đani Pervan is a Bosnian musician, songwriter, record producer, and sound engineer.

Life and career 
Pervan was born and raised in Sarajevo, SR Bosnia and Herzegovina. He is a self-taught musician.

In 1985, Pervan joined rock band Letu Štuke where he performed as a drummer on their demo songs.

In 1987, Pervan joined rock band Major as a drummer. He performed on their first studio album; Son Late Zigi Daj (1989).

As a drummer, Pervan joined jazz band Don Guido i Misionari in 1990.

In 1994, Pervan moved to Paris, France, with a pop-rock band Overdream. Next to him, the band members are Samir Ćeramida, Dušan Vranić, Sejo Kovo, and Boris Bačvić. The band released their only studio album in 1996.

In 1996, Pervan accompanied Sejo Sexon and Elvis J. Kurtović, with whom he restarted band Zabranjeno Pušenje, disbanded in the early 1990s. He performed on their fifth studio album, Fildžan viška, which was released in 1997.

American singer-songwriter Michael Stipe hired Pervan and Dušan Vranić to make remixes of two songs, "I've Been High" and "Beachball", from R.E.M.'s album Reveal (2001). The two of them did mentioned remixes under pseudonym Chef.

In 2001, Pervan accompanied Darko Rundek with whom he co-produced his studio album Ruke (2002). Also, he joined the Darko Rundek & Cargo Orkestar at the same time.

In 2005, Pervan returned to Sarajevo to work with his original band Letu Štuke.

Discography 
Major
 Son Late Zigi Daj (1989)

Overdream
 Overdream (1996)

Zabranjeno pušenje
 Fildžan viška (1997)

Darko Rundek & Cargo Orkestar
 Ruke (2002)
 Zagrebačka Magla: Plava turneja 2003 Live (2004)
 Mhm A-ha Oh Yeah Da-Da! (2006)
 Live u Domu omladine (2008)

Letu štuke
 Letu štuke (2005)
 Proteini i ugljikohidrati (2008)
 Brojevi računa (2011)

References

External links
 Đani Pervan on Discogs
 Đani Pervan on LinkedIn

Year of birth missing (living people)
Living people
Audio engineers
Bosnia and Herzegovina guitarists
Bosnia and Herzegovina male guitarists
Bosnia and Herzegovina record producers
Bosnia and Herzegovina rock musicians
Bosnia and Herzegovina songwriters
Bosnia and Herzegovina expatriates in France
Musicians from Sarajevo
Zabranjeno pušenje members